Kolhuwa  is a village development committee in Nawalparasi District in the Lumbini Zone of southern Nepal. At the time of the 1991 Nepal census it had a population of 6292 people living in 1025 individual households.
.This VDC was merged in the Madhyabindu municipality  on 19 September 2015 along with Tamasariya and Narayani Village development committees (VDCs). The center of the municipality is established in the former Tamasariya VDC of Chormara  Bazaar. After merging the three VDCs population it had a total population of 28,224 according to 2011 Nepal census.

References

Populated places in Nawalpur District